Henri Fréville (4 December 1905, in Norrent-Fontes, Pas-de-Calais – 15 June 1987, in Rennes, Ille-et-Vilaine) was a French history professor, resistor, writer and politician.

Life
He was history professor at the lycée Chateaubriand at Rennes from 1932 and from 1949 to 1971 taught modern history at the Faculty of Letters at Rennes, which became the Université Rennes II. He was one of the founders of the Institut armoricain de recherches historiques.

On the Liberation, he was director of the cabinet of Victor Le Gorgeu, Commissaire régional de la République for the four Breton départements.

He was mayor (MRP) of Rennes from 1953 to 1977, president of the conseil général d'Ille-et-Vilaine from 1966 to 1976, député of the 1st constituency of Ille-et-Vilaine from 1958 to 1968, senator for Ille-et-Vilaine from 1970 to 1977. He was the target of an FLB attack on 26 August 1975.

Author of several works of history, he notably studied the behaviour of Breton nationalists during the Second World War through documents of the German military administration, recovered from the surroundings of the hôtel Majestic.

Honours
On 10 May 1993, Rennes renamed its avenue de Crimée the avenue Henri-Fréville after him, and a Metro station in the town (line A) is also named after him.

Publications
 L'Intendance de Bretagne (1689–1790). Essai sur l'histoire d'une intendance en Pays d'États au XVIIIe, I/III. Thesis. Rennes, Plihon, 1953. 3 vol.
 Un acte de foi : trente ans au service de la Cité ; Rennes : Éditions SEPES, 1977. 
 La presse bretonne dans la tourmente : 1940–1946, Plon, Paris, 1979
 Archives secrètes de Bretagne, 1940–1944, Ouest-France, Rennes, 1985 (reedited 2004 and 2008, reviewed and corrected by Françoise Morvan),  (2008 ed.).

Bibliography

Notes and references

External links
  His page on the Assemblée Nationale site
  His page on the Sénat site
 The Archives départementales d'Ille-et-Vilaine hold the archives of Henri Fréville, sous-série 52 J, soit 9 mètres linéaires.

1905 births
1987 deaths
People from Pas-de-Calais
French Resistance members
Academic staff of the University of Rennes
Academic staff of Rennes 2 University
French Senators of the Fifth Republic
Deputies of the 1st National Assembly of the French Fifth Republic
Mayors of Rennes
Deputies of the 2nd National Assembly of the French Fifth Republic
Politicians from Brittany
Popular Republican Movement politicians
20th-century French historians
French male non-fiction writers
Senators of Ille-et-Vilaine
Deputies of the 3rd National Assembly of the French Fifth Republic
20th-century French male writers